Polygrammodes phyllophila is a moth in the family Crambidae. It was described by Arthur Gardiner Butler in 1878. It is found in Madagascar, South Africa, Uganda and Zambia.

References

Spilomelinae
Moths described in 1878
Moths of Africa